Gula language may refer to several African languages:

 Three closely related Bua languages in southern Chad
 Two less closely related Bongo-Baguirmi languages:
 Gula language (Chad)
 Tar Gula language in the Central African Republic and Sudan
 Gola language in Liberia

See also
Gullah language, an African-English creole on the southern coast of the United States